Tiruttani is a state assembly constituency in Tiruvallur district in Tamil Nadu. Its State Assembly Constituency number is 3. It consists of Pallipattu taluk and a portion of Tiruttani taluk. It falls under Arakkonam Lok Sabha constituency. It is one of the 234 State Legislative Assembly Constituencies in Tamil Nadu, in India. Elections and winners in the constituency are listed below.

Demographics

Madras State

Tamil Nadu

Election results

2021

2016

2011

2006

2001

1996

1991

1989

1984

1980

1977

1971

1967

1962

1952

References 

 

Assembly constituencies of Tamil Nadu
Tiruvallur district